Wringing may refer to:

Wringing (gauge blocks), the temporary attachment of gauge blocks to each other
Wringer, a device that extracts liquid by action of twisting or squeezing (see: mangle (machine))
Neck wringing (see: strangling)

See also
Rett syndrome, a genetic postnatal neurological disorder
Danny Wring, English former professional footballer
Ringing (disambiguation)